The 8th Politburo of the Workers' Party of Korea (WPK)(8차조선로동당정치국), officially the Political Bureau of the 8th Central Committee of the Workers' Party of Korea, was elected on 11 January 2021 by the 1st Plenary Session of the 8th Central Committee during the 8th WPK Congress.

Meetings

Members elected at the 1st Plenary Session

Alternates elected at the 1st Plenary Session

Changes (2021–present)

References

External links
 Press release of First Plenary Meeting of Eighth WPK Central Committee issued

8th Politburo of the Workers' Party of Korea